Janet Leigh was an American actress of film, television, stage, and radio, whose career spanned over five decades. Discovered by actress Norma Shearer, Leigh began her career appearing in several popular films for MGM which spanned a wide variety of genres, including Act of Violence (1948), Little Women (1949), Angels in the Outfield (1951), Scaramouche (1952), The Naked Spur (1953), and Living It Up (1954).

In the latter part of the 1950s, Leigh had supporting roles in  Safari (1956), and Orson Welles's film noir Touch of Evil (1958). She went on to gain lasting recognition for her portrayal of the doomed Marion Crane in Alfred Hitchcock's horror film Psycho (1960), which earned her a Golden Globe Award for Best Supporting Actress and an Academy Award nomination for Best Supporting Actress.

In 1962, she starred in the thriller The Manchurian Candidate, before deciding to scale back her career. Leigh continued to appear in films intermittently throughout the 1960s, with roles in Bye Bye Birdie (1963) and Harper (1966). She began to appear in television frequently in the 1970s, and had roles in such films as Night of the Lepus (1972) and Boardwalk (1979). In 1975, she made her Broadway debut in a production of Murder Among Friends. Leigh subsequently starred in two horror films with her daughter, Jamie Lee Curtis: John Carpenter's The Fog (1980) and Halloween H20: 20 Years Later (1998).

Her last film role was in the comedy Bad Girls from Valley High, filmed in 2000 and released posthumously. Leigh died in 2004 of vasculitis, aged 77.

Film

Television

Radio

Stage

References

Sources

Actress filmographies
American filmographies